Thomas John Seymour Phillips (7 July 1951 – 31 March 2017) was a Welsh footballer who played as a goalkeeper for various English clubs and the Welsh national team.

Phillips started out with his home town club, Shrewsbury Town, for whom he made 51 appearances, before transferring to Aston Villa at the age of 18. After only a handful of matches for Villa, Phillips joined Chelsea in August 1970 for £25,000. He was to spend the majority of his career with the west London club as the long-term understudy to Peter Bonetti and only once, in 1974–75, was he to make over 30 appearances in a season for the club. He made a total of 149 appearances for Chelsea.

He left Chelsea in 1980 and had brief spells with Crewe Alexandra, Brighton & Hove Albion, Charlton Athletic, Crystal Palace and Sea Bee in Hong Kong. John Toshack signed Phillips for Swansea City in the early Eighties, but he never made the first team. He also won 4 caps for the Wales national team. Phillips died in 2017 at the age of 65 after a long illness.

References 

1951 births
2017 deaths
Welsh footballers
Wales international footballers
Wales under-23 international footballers
Association football goalkeepers
Aston Villa F.C. players
Brighton & Hove Albion F.C. players
Charlton Athletic F.C. players
Chelsea F.C. players
Crewe Alexandra F.C. players
Crystal Palace F.C. players
Shrewsbury Town F.C. players
English Football League players
Welsh expatriate footballers
Expatriate footballers in Hong Kong
Welsh expatriate sportspeople in Hong Kong
Sportspeople from Shrewsbury